Susan Elizabeth Strasberg (May 22, 1938 – January 21, 1999) was an American stage, film, and television actress. Thought to be the next Hepburn-type ingenue, she was nominated for a Tony Award at age 18, playing the title role in The Diary of Anne Frank. She appeared on the covers of LIFE and Newsweek in 1955. A close friend of Marilyn Monroe and Richard Burton, she wrote two best-selling tell-all books. Her later career primarily consisted of slasher and horror films, followed by TV roles, by the 1980s.

Biography

Early life

Strasberg was born in New York City to theatre director and drama coach Lee Strasberg of the Actors Studio and former actress Paula Strasberg. Her brother, John, is an acting coach. Her father was born in what is now Ukraine, and her mother in New York City. They were both from Jewish families who emigrated from Europe.

Strasberg attended the Professional Children's School, and then spent time at both The High School of Music & Art and the High School of Performing Arts. She also did some modelling.

Early roles
At age 14, Strasberg appeared off-Broadway in Maya in 1953, which ran seven performances. Her TV debut was in "Catch a Falling Star", an episode of Goodyear Playhouse directed by Delbert Mann the same year.

She was in Romeo and Juliet for Kraft Theatre (1954), playing Juliet, and episodes of General Electric Theater and Omnibus.

She had a regular role in a short-lived sitcom, The Marriage, playing the daughter of Hume Cronyn and Jessica Tandy. It was the first network show broadcast in color.

Strasberg made her film debut in The Cobweb (1955). She followed it with a widely praised performance as a teenager in Picnic (1955), playing the younger sister of Kim Novak. Kim Stanley played the role on Broadway but was too old for film. Joshua Logan, the director, wrote Strasberg's "incipient beauty and spirit seemed just right for me."

The Diary of Anne Frank
Strasberg originated the title role in the Broadway production of The Diary of Anne Frank, directed by Garson Kanin, which ran for 717 performances from 1955 to 1957. Brooks Atkinson wrote that she was "a slender, enchanting young lady with a heart-shaped face, a pair of burning eyes, and the soul of an actress."

Strasberg was nominated for a Tony Award at the age of 18 and became the youngest actress to star on Broadway with her name above the marquee title. In 1955 she appeared twice on the cover of Life (July 11, 1955 issue; November 11, 1955 issue) and soon after on the cover of Newsweek (December 19, 1955 issue).

During her run on the show she did The Cradle Song with Helen Hayes on TV.

The success of the play led to numerous film offers. She decided on the lead in Stage Struck (1958), directed by Sidney Lumet. It was a remake of Morning Glory (1933) with Katharine Hepburn. According to one obituary, "It had seemed as if the beautiful, dark-haired actress might have an impact equal to that made by Jean Simmons and Audrey Hepburn as ingenues."

Strasberg was not cast in the George Stevens film version of Anne Frank. Several reasons have been suggested for this: that Stevens did not want to deal with the influence of Strasberg's mother, Paula, and that Stevens saw Strasberg at the end of the play's run when her performance had become tired. Strasberg did not test for the role.

Strasberg's next appearance on Broadway was in Time Remembered (1957–58) by Jean Anouilh with Richard Burton and Helen Hayes. It was another success and ran for 248 performances.

Strasberg continued to guest star on TV shows like Westinghouse Desilu Playhouse, Play of the Week (a production of The Cherry Orchard with Hayes), and Our American Heritage.

She was in the cast of the New York City Centre production of William Saroyan's The Time of Your Life that played at the Brussels World Fair in 1958. It was filmed for Armchair Theatre.

Strasberg appeared in Sean O'Casey's The Shadow of a Gunman (1958–59) for Jack Garfein alongside members of the Actors Studio; it ran for 52 performances. Brooks Atkinson said she had "willowy freshness".

In 1959 she toured with Franchot Tone in Caesar and Cleopatra.

Italy
She went to Europe to star in the Italian–Yugoslav Holocaust film Kapò (1960), which was nominated for an Academy Award as its year's Best Foreign Language Film.

Strasberg based herself in Italy for the next few years. "I wanted to see what it was like when I was alone", she said.

In Rome, the Teatro Tordinona has dedicated a hall in her memory.

She traveled to England to make Scream of Fear (1961) for Hammer Films, and in Italy did Disorder (1962) with Louis Jourdan and the Hollywood film Hemingway's Adventures of a Young Man (1962).

Return to US
Strasberg returned to the US to appear on Broadway in The Lady of the Camellias (1963), directed by Franco Zeffirelli. The director said Strasberg had the qualities of being "romantic, cynical, classical, contemporary." The show only ran for 13 performances.

Strasberg began to concentrate on television, guest-starring on Dr Kildare, Bob Hope Presents the Chrysler Theatre, Breaking Point, Burke's Law, and The Rogues.

She made The High Bright Sun (1965) in England then went back to TV: Run for Your Life, The Legend of Jesse James (starring Christopher Jones, who became her husband), The Big Valley and The Invaders.

She made Chubasco (1967) with Jones, and did some counterculture movies: The Trip (1967) for Roger Corman, as the wife of Peter Fonda, and Psych-Out (1968) with Jack Nicholson. She also did The Name of the Game Is Kill! (1968), The Brotherhood (1968) and The Sisters (1969).

Late 1960s and 1970s
In the late 1960s & 1970s Strasberg did mostly TV: The Big Valley; The Virginian; Bonanza; Lancer; The Name of the Game; Premiere; The F.B.I.; CBS Playhouse; Marcus Welby, M.D.; The Streets of San Francisco; Night Gallery; McCloud; Alias Smith & Jones; The Sixth Sense; Assignment Vienna; The Wide World of Mystery; The Evil Touch; Owen Marshall, Counselor at Law; The Rockford Files (twice); and Mannix. "I did mediocre things because that way I didn't have to test myself", she said later. "I had a tremendous need not to shame my father."

She did occasional TV movies like Hauser's Memory (1970), Mr. and Mrs. Bo Jo Jones (1971) and ...And Millions Die! (1973) and the occasional feature like Ternos Caçadores (1970), The Legend of Hillbilly John (1972), and Orson Welles' The Other Side of the Wind (ultimately released in 2018).

Strasberg had a regular role on the series Toma (1974). She guested on Police Surgeon, McMillan & Wife, Petrocelli,  Ellery Queen, Kate McShane, Medical Story, Bronk, and Harry O.

Strasberg had the lead in So Evil, My Sister (1974) and was in Mystery at Malibu (1976), Sammy Somebody (1976), SST: Death Flight (1977), Rollercoaster (1977), The Manitou (1977),Tre soldi e la donna di classe (1977), In Praise of Older Women (1978), The Immigrants (1978), and Beggarman, Thief (1979).

In 1976 she appeared in a short film directed by Lee Grant called The Stronger, based on a play by August Strindberg, which she said reignited her passion for acting.

In 1980 she published a memoir, Bittersweet, because she said her career was "stalled. . . . It seemed totally untenable to me, acting for 25 years—I had played Juliet, Cleopatra, and Anne Frank—and there I was, sitting in Hollywood just waiting for somebody to want me."

1980s
In the 1980s Strasberg's credits included Bloody Birthday (1981); The Love Boat; Mazes and Monsters (1982); Sweet Sixteen (1983); The Returning (1983); The New Mike Hammer; Tales of the Unexpected; Tales from the Darkside; The Delta Force (1986); Remington Steele; Hot Shots; Murder, She Wrote; Cagney & Lacey; and The Runnin' Kind (1989).

"I love acting", she said in 1983. "I mean, I can't quite conceive of not doing it. But it's less important to me since I started writing, because I really like writing. And I really enjoy, I love lecturing and speaking and having that kind of contact with people too."

Her last performances included the biopic Schweitzer (1990), the action movie Prime Suspect (1990) with Frank Stallone and Il giardino dei ciliegi (1992).

In 1993 she was a jury member for the 43rd Berlin International Film Festival.

Writing

Strasberg wrote two best-selling books. Bittersweet was an autobiography in which she wrote about her tumultuous relationships with her parents and with actors Richard Burton and Christopher Jones, as well as with her own daughter's struggles with a heart defect. She received a $100,000 advance for it and sold paperback rights for $300,000.

Marilyn and Me: Sisters, Rivals, Friends (1992) was about Strasberg's friendship with Marilyn Monroe, whom she called a "surrogate sister" and a "member" of the Strasberg family for many years.

Strasberg was working on a third book about her personal spiritual journey at the time of her death entitled Confessions of a New Age Heretic.

Personal life
Before her marriage, Strasberg had relationships with Warren Beatty, Cary Grant, and Richard Burton.

On September 25, 1965, Strasberg married actor Christopher Jones, with whom she had appeared in an episode of The Legend of Jesse James in Las Vegas. Their daughter, Jennifer Robin, was born six months later. The couple divorced in 1968 due to her husband's mental instability. Jennifer was born with a congenital birth defect, which Strasberg blamed on her and Jones's drug-taking.

Death
In the mid-1990s Strasberg was diagnosed with breast cancer. Although believed to be in remission, she died of the disease at her home in New York City on January 21, 1999, at the age of 60.

Filmography and television

The Cobweb (1955) as Sue Brett
Picnic (1955) as Millie Owens
1955 Motion Picture Theatre Celebration (1955) (short subject)
Stage Struck (1958) as Eva Lovelace
Kapò (1960) as Edith, alias Nicole Niepas
Scream of Fear (1961) as Penny Appleby
Disorder (1962) as Isabella
Hemingway's Adventures of a Young Man (1962) as Rosanna
The Shortest Day (1962) (uncredited)
The High Bright Sun (1965) as Juno Kozani
The Invaders, "Quantity Unknown" (Season 1: Episode 8, 1967) as Diane Oberly
The Big Valley (1967, Episode: "Night in a Small Town") as Sally 
The F.B.I. (1967, Episode: "The Executioners") as Chris Roland
Chubasco (1968) as Bunny
The Trip (1967) as Sally Groves
Psych-Out (1968) as Jenny Davis
The Name of the Game Is Kill! (1968) as Mickey Terry
Bonanza (1968, Episode: "A Severe Case Of Matrimony") as Rosalita 
The Brotherhood (1968) as Emma Ginetta
The Sisters (1969) as Martha
Sweet Hunters (1969) as Lis
McCloud (1970) as Lorraine / Annette Bardege
Night Gallery (1971–1973, 2 episodes) as Sheila Trent / Ruth Asquith (segment "Midnight Never Ends")
The Sixth Sense (TV series) (1972: Once Upon a Chilling")
The Legend of Hillbilly John (1972) as Polly Wiltse
Frankenstein (1973) as Elizabeth Lavenza
Toma (1973) as Patty Toma (series regular; 23 episodes)
And Millions Will Die (1973) as Heather Kessler
The Rockford Files (1974, Episode: "The Countess") as Deborah Ryder
So Evil, My Sister (1974) as Brenda
McMillan and Wife (1974) as Virginia Ryan
Sammy Somebody (1976) 
The Rockford Files (1976, Episode: "A Bad Deal In The Valley") as Karen Stiles
The Stronger (1976, Short)
Rollercoaster (1977) as Fran
Tre soldi e la donna di classe (1977)
The Manitou (1978) as Karen Tandy
In Praise of Older Women (1978) as Bobbie
The Immigrants (1978) as Sarah Levy
$weepstake$ (1979, Episode: "Roscoe, Elizabeth, and the M.C.") as Beverly
Beggarman, Thief (1979) as Ida Cohen
Acting: Lee Strasberg and the Actors Studio (1981, Documentary)
Bloody Birthday (1981) as Miss Viola Davis
Mazes and Monsters (1982) as Meg
Sweet Sixteen (1983) as Joanne Morgan
The Returning (1983) as Sybil Ophir
Tales of the Unexpected (1984–1985, TV Series) as Roberta Elton / Madame Myra
Tales from the Darkside (1985) as artist Kate in episode "Effect and Cause"
The Delta Force (1986) as Debra Levine (Passenger)
Remembering Marilyn (1987, Documentary)
Murder, She Wrote (1987, Episode: "The Days Dwindle Down") as Dorothy Hearn Davis
Marilyn Monroe: Beyond the Legend (1987, Documentary)
The Runnin' Kind (1989) as Carol Curtis
Prime Suspect (1989) as Dr. Celia Warren
 (1990) as Helene Schweitzer
The Cherry Orchard (1992) as Livia
Love, Marilyn (2012, Documentary)
The Other Side of the Wind (2018; shot between 1970 and 1976) as Juliette Riche

Awards and nominations

References

External links

 
 
 
 
 John Strasberg Studios
  video, 6 min.

1938 births
1999 deaths
20th-century American actresses
Actresses from New York City
American expatriates in Italy
American film actresses
20th-century American memoirists
American stage actresses
American television actresses
Deaths from breast cancer
Deaths from cancer in New York (state)
Jewish American actresses
Jewish American writers
American women memoirists
20th-century American women writers
Jewish women writers
The High School of Music & Art alumni
20th-century American Jews